The "Shot heard round the world" is a term used in reference to one of the most historic goals in U.S. soccer history, which allowed the U.S. national team to make it to the 1990 FIFA World Cup after 36 years of failed attempts to qualify. This goal was scored in the qualification game between United States and Trinidad and Tobago on November 19, 1989 in Port of Spain.

The U.S. team had not qualified for a FIFA World Cup since 1950, and the U.S. (having been selected by FIFA in 1988 to host the 1994 FIFA World Cup) wanted to give a good impression to the world of soccer by qualifying to the 1990 World Cup.

Background

The United States was one of the five nations competing in the final round of CONCACAF's qualifiers for two spots at the upcoming World Cup in Italy, the other involved nations being Costa Rica, Guatemala, El Salvador and Trinidad & Tobago. Mexico was disqualified due to a scandal related with the age adulteration for a youth tournament, known as los cachirules. In that time, the U.S. team was formed mainly by college and semi-professional players.

They started by losing 1–0 to Costa Rica, then they got revenge by beating Costa Rica 1–0, tied 1–1 against Trinidad and Tobago, won 2–1 against Guatemala and won 1–0 against El Salvador. After scoreless draws against both Guatemala and El Salvador, the situation of the group was as follows:

The United States needed a win in order to qualify for the World Cup because a loss or a draw would allow Trinidad and Tobago to qualify. Costa Rica had already qualified for the tournament in Italy.

Match
The game was played on November 19, 1989 in the Hasely Crawford Stadium in Port of Spain. The stadium was painted red, as an homage to the Strike Squad as the Trinidad and Tobago team was then known as.

In the first minutes, John Harkes tried unsuccessfully to score. Trinidad and Tobago's Elliot Allen had two attempts on goal. At the 30th minute, Bruce Murray passed the ball to Paul Caligiuri, who dodged a rival defender and with a left-footed shot scored 1–0 for the United States. Trinidadian goalkeeper Michael Maurice waited for the ball practically standing on the goal-line, but he couldn't see it, arguing that the sun had blinded him.

In the second half, the Trinidadian team went into attack in order to get a draw, but their efforts were in vain, as American goalkeeper Tony Meola was able to stop Trinidad and Tobago's attempts. After the final whistle, the U.S. celebrated the victory while Trinidad and Tobago was left in consternation.

Details

|}

Post-match
After game, the group results were as follows:

Due to the political situation in El Salvador and the fact that El Salvador and Guatemala had no chances to qualify for the World Cup by winning both matches, the matches still to be played between El Salvador and Guatemala were cancelled.

The U.S. press, considering the significance of the result, described Caligiuri's goal as "the shot heard 'round the world".

After 36 years of absences from the World Cup, the U.S. team qualified for the 1990 World Cup but its participation in the tournament was brief. They lost 1–5 to Czechoslovakia, 0–1 against hosts Italy, and 1–2 against Austria. The U.S. would consecutively qualify for the next six subsequent World Cups, but failed to keep the streak going in 2018 as they lost 2–1 to, by irony, Trinidad and Tobago during their final qualification game.

Trinidad and Tobago suffered a protracted crisis of confidence until their own World Cup dream finally came true in 2005, after beating Bahrain 2–1 on aggregate in an intercontinental play-off, which allowed the Soca Warriors to qualify to the 2006 FIFA World Cup in Germany. Yorke and Latapy (survivors of the qualifying campaign of 1989) were part of that Trinidadian team, which in that World Cup drew against Sweden 0–0 and lost against England 2–0 and Paraguay 2–0, being eliminated in the first round.

References

External links
 

1989 CONCACAF Championship
1989 in American soccer
1989 in Trinidad and Tobago football
United States men's national soccer team matches
Trinidad and Tobago national football team matches
FIFA World Cup qualification matches
International association football competitions hosted by Trinidad and Tobago
November 1989 sports events in North America
Sport in Port of Spain
20th century in Port of Spain
1989 in American sports
1989 in the United States